Margit Bangó (born 4 April 1950) is a Hungarian singer and entertainer.

Biography
Bangó was born into a Romani musical family under the name Margit Szabó, her father played the dulcimer and her mother sang. In 1967, at the age of 17, with the encouragement of her mother, she applied to Magyar Rádió's talent search competition, after which the station recorded her. In the 1980s, Horváth had a joint program with Pista on state television. In 1985, Bangó appeared in the film Átok és szerelem, in which she played the role of Punka. At the beginning of the 1990s, she started performing with the Budapest Gypsy Symphony Orchestra.

Personal life
Bangó married young; her first husband was Lajos Bangó, but their marriage only lasted a year and a half. Their daughter, Marika, was born from this relationship. After her divorce with her first husband, she could no longer leave the name Bangó, with this name, along with Lajos Bangó, she entered the musical public consciousness as Margit Bangó, and has been using it as her stage name ever since. Bangó later remarried, and for ten years he was with Sándor Járóka. She was once the youngest grandmother in the country.

Discography

CD 
 Voor Jan Cremer (1990)
 Kék nefelejcs, el ne felejts – Evergreens
 Legkedvesebb cigánydalaim
 Benned láttam életemnek minden boldogságát
 Kik is a cigányok
 Mulassatok cigányok
 Reggelig csak mulatunk...
 Halk zenével gyógyítom a lelkem
 Benned láttam életemnek minden boldogságát (2000)
 Halk zene szól az éjszakában (2001)
 A szeretet dalai (2002)
 Felnézek a nagy égre (2004)
 Két gitár (2007)
 Mulatok, mert jól érzem magam (2008)
 40 év – jubileumi koncert (2009)
 Minden nap, minden éjszakán (2010)
 Gipsy Mediterrán  (2016)

DVD 
 Sej, haj cigányélet
 40 év – jubileumi koncert (2009)

Awards
In 2006, Bangó was honored with the Kossuth Prize, Hungary's most prestigious arts award.

References

1950 births
Living people
People from Vásárosnamény
Hungarian Romani people
Romani musicians
20th-century Hungarian women singers
21st-century Hungarian women singers